Thiru. Vi. Ka. Nagar (SC) is a state assembly constituency in Tamil Nadu, India, formed after constituency delimitation. Its State Assembly Constituency number is 15. The seat is reserved for candidates from the Scheduled Castes. It is included in the Chennai North parliamentary constituency. It is one of the 234 State Legislative Assembly Constituencies in Tamil Nadu.

Although it is named after the neighbourhood of Thiru.Vi.Ka Nagar, that area is not included in the constituency but rather in the Kolathur constituency. Thiru.Vi.Ka Nagar constituency comprises:
Perambur (part)
Ayanavaram
Otteri
Pattalam
Pulianthope

Members of the Assembly

Election results

2021

2016

2011

References

2. http://www.elections.in/tamil-nadu/assembly-constituencies/thiru-vi-ka-nagar.html

Assembly constituencies of Tamil Nadu
Politics of Chennai